Chaetosomodes is a genus of beetles in the family Chaetosomatidae, containing the single species Chaetosomodes halli.

References 

 
 

Chaetosomatidae
Cleroidea genera
Monotypic Cucujiformia genera